In enzymology, a beta-ureidopropionase is an enzyme that catalyzes the chemical reaction

N-carbamoyl-beta-alanine + H2O  beta-alanine + CO2 + NH3

Thus, the two substrates of this enzyme are N-carbamoyl-beta-alanine and H2O, whereas its 3 products are beta-alanine, CO2, and NH3.

This enzyme belongs to the family of hydrolases, those acting on carbon-nitrogen bonds other than peptide bonds, specifically in linear amides.  The systematic name of this enzyme class is N-carbamoyl-beta-alanine amidohydrolase. This enzyme participates in 3 metabolic pathways: pyrimidine metabolism, beta-alanine metabolism, and pantothenate and coenzyme A biosynthesis.

Structural studies

References

 
 
 

EC 3.5.1
Enzymes of known structure